Negash Teklit (born 12 April 1966) is an Eritrean professional football player and manager.

Career

In the 1980s he played for the Ethiopia national football team.

In April 2002 he coached the Eritrea national football team at the 1st Africa Military Games (CISM) in Nairobi. Later, he worked in the staff of representation.

Since 2009 until December 2012 he was a head coach of the Eritrea national football team.

Selections U20 directed Eritrea to the end in CECAFA U-20 Championship in 2010, but lost the final of the U-20 National Teams Uganda.

References

External links
 
 
 Profile at Soccerpunter.com
 

Living people
Ethiopian footballers
Ethiopia international footballers
Eritrean football managers
Eritrea national football team managers
1970 births

Association footballers not categorized by position